My Aunt, Your Aunt is a 1927 German silent comedy film directed by Carl Froelich and starring Ralph Arthur Roberts, Angelo Ferrari and Henny Porten. It was shot at the Tempelhof Studios in Berlin and premiered at the city's Ufa-Palast am Zoo. The film's sets were designed by the art director Franz Schroedter. It was made by the leading German studio of the era UFA GmbH and distributed as part of the Parufamet agreement.

It shares its name with two sound films released in 1939 and 1956.

Cast
 Ralph Arthur Roberts as Bodo von Bocksdorf
 Angelo Ferrari as Edgar von Bocksdorf, dessen Neffe
 Henny Porten as Helene, seine Frau
 Harry Grunwald as Pepi Smith, Artist
 Leopold von Ledebur as Der Diener
 Willi Allen as Der Koch
 Marian Alma as Der Pfarrer
 Hans Baldner as Der Arzt
 Hugo Döblin as Der Apotheker
 Wilhelm Bendow as Dr. Gänsichen
 Alice Torning as Seine Braut

References

Bibliography
 Grange, William. Cultural Chronicle of the Weimar Republic. Scarecrow Press, 2008.

External links

1927 films
1927 comedy films
Films of the Weimar Republic
German silent feature films
German comedy films
Films directed by Carl Froelich
UFA GmbH films
German black-and-white films
Silent comedy films
1920s German films
Films shot at Tempelhof Studios
1920s German-language films